The 2007 Toyota/Save Mart 350 was the sixteenth stock car race of the 2007 NASCAR Nextel Cup Series and the first of the season's two road course events. It was held on June 24, 2007 at Infineon Raceway in Sonoma, California before a crowd of 102,000. The 90-lap race was won by Juan Pablo Montoya of the Chip Ganassi Racing team who started from thirty-second position. Kevin Harvick finished second and his Richard Childress Racing teammate Jeff Burton came in third.

Although Jamie McMurray won the pole position, he was passed by Robby Gordon on the first lap. Gordon held the position until the first round of green-flag pit stops, and Carl Edwards took over the first position. He held it for twelve laps until Gordon got ahead of Edwards. At the race's final restart on lap 70, Tony Stewart took over the lead when he passed Gordon, but ceded it to McMurray after Stewart made a pit stop. McMurray slowed on lap 97 as he attempted to conserve fuel which allowed Montoya to close the gap. Montoya got ahead of McMurray for the lead after a seven-lap battle and held it to win the race. There were seven cautions and eleven lead changes by eight drivers.

It was Montoya's first win in the Nextel Cup Series, and became the first foreign driver since 1974 to win in the series. After the race Jeff Gordon's lead in the Drivers' Championship was reduced because he, along with his teammate Jimmie Johnson, were penalized for a car infringement. Chevrolet maintained its lead in the Manufacturers' Championship, 49 points ahead of their nearest rival Ford with twenty races remaining in the season. The race attracted 6.5 million television viewers.

Background 

The 2007 Toyota/Save Mart 350 was the sixteenth of thirty-six scheduled stock car races of the 2007 NASCAR Nextel Cup Series. It took place on June 24, 2007, in Sonoma, California, at Infineon Raceway, one of two road courses to hold NASCAR races, the other is Watkins Glen International. The Chute was only used for NASCAR events such as this race, and was criticized by many drivers, who preferred the full layout.

Before the race, Jeff Gordon led the Drivers' Championship with 2,392 points, with Denny Hamlin in second and Jimmie Johnson third. Matt Kenseth and Jeff Burton were fourth and fifth, and Carl Edwards, Tony Stewart, Kevin Harvick, Clint Bowyer, Martin Truex Jr., Kyle Busch and Dale Earnhardt Jr. rounded out the top twelve. Chevrolet led the Manufacturers' Championship with 129 points, 47 ahead of their nearest rival Ford in second. Dodge was third on 73 points, and Toyota was fourth on 47. Jeff Gordon was the race's defending champion.

Several teams chose to temporarily replace their regular drivers with road course ringers. Michael Waltrip Racing replaced Michael Waltrip and David Reutimann with two-time NASCAR Nextel Cup Series champion Terry Labonte and the 1993 24 Hours of Daytona winner P. J. Jones. BAM Racing chose to replace Mike Bliss (who was competing at The Milwaukee Mile) with the 2005 Trans-Am Series champion Klaus Graf, while Hall of Fame Racing replaced Tony Raines with endurance driver Ron Fellows. Former SCCA Trans-Am champion Brian Simo was selected by Front Row Motorsports to drive the No. 37 Dodge, while American Le Mans Series and Busch Series East race winner Butch Leitzinger was selected to replace Bill Davis Racing driver Jeremy Mayfield. Brandon Ash attempted to qualify in his self-owned No. 02 car, and endurance racing driver Marc Goossens was entered in the No. 91 Riley-D'Hondt Motorsports Toyota. Scott Pruett announced he would not participate for the Chip Ganassi Racing team due to a scheduling conflict; Former V8 Supercars champion Marcos Ambrose, who was scheduled to drive the No. 47 JTG Daugherty Racing car withdrew.

Rookie of the Year competitor Juan Pablo Montoya made his NASCAR début on a road course after leaving Formula One in 2006, and was considered by several drivers to be a contender to win the race despite no previous experience of driving at Infineon Raceway. Montoya said he hoped to have a chance of winning, and expected his main rival to be Jeff Gordon. After he finished with a top-ten at the previous round (the Citizen Bank 400) Jamie McMurray hoped to continue his momentum into Sonona, and move up in the Drivers' Championship standings.

Practice and qualifying 

Three practice sessions were held before the Sunday race: one on Friday and two on Saturday. The first session lasted 90 minutes, the second 50 minutes and the third 60 minutes. Gordon and Johnson were prohibited from competing in the first practice session and Friday's qualifier because their right-front fenders were deemed too wide by race officials during a pre-event inspection, and both drivers were required to start at the rear of the field for the race. Bobby Labonte was fastest in the first practice session with a time of 77.539 seconds; Robby Gordon was second and Kurt Busch third. Stewart took fourth position, and McMurray placed fifth. Fellows, Edwards, Ryan Newman, Harvick and Kasey Kahne rounded out the session's top-ten fastest drivers. Said, Dave Blaney and Stewart went off the track but continued.

Fifty-two drivers were entered in the qualifier on Friday evening; due to NASCAR's qualifying procedure forty-three were allowed to race. Each driver ran two laps, with the starting order determined by the competitor's fastest times. McMurray clinched the third pole position of his career, and his first since the 2005 Pennsylvania 500, with a time of 77.521 seconds. He had an advantage because he recorded his lap when weather conditions were cooler. McMurray was joined on the grid's front row by Robby Gordon and had the pole position until McMurray's lap. Earnhardt qualified third, Said fourth and Stewart started fifth. Burton, Bill Elliott, Kahne, Newman and Bowyer rounded out the top ten qualifiers. The nine drivers who failed to qualify were Ward Burton, Scott Riggs, Ash, Paul Menard, Brian Vickers, A. J. Allmendinger, Simo, Kenny Wallace and Graf. After the qualifier McMurray said that he was slightly nervous and felt another driver could record a faster lap time, "I definitely felt with Juan and Ryan going out later, I would definitely get beat. I kept telling everybody that. My heart was definitely beating faster this morning when I got up, looking forward to this."

On Saturday afternoon in cool weather conditions Montoya was fastest in the second practice session with a lap of 77.591 seconds, ahead of Harvick and Jeff Gordon. Stewart was fourth-fastest; Fellows was fifth and Kyle Busch sixth. Kahne, Elliott Sadler, Bobby Labonte and Edwards followed in the top ten. David Ragan stalled after he spun. Afterward, Edwards and Ragan left the track and flew to Milwaukee Mile to participate in the AT&T 250 Busch Series race; both drivers returned to Sonoma after the race's completion. Later that day, Hamlin paced the final practice session with a time of 78.219; Stewart was second and Robby Gordon third. Harvick was fourth-fastest, ahead of Sadler and Newman. Fellows was seventh-fastest, McMurray eighth, Johnson ninth and Jeff Gordon tenth. Hamlin was afflicted with an electrical issue which was corrected after his team installed a new distributor. J. J. Yeley damaged his car's sheet metal structure in an accident at turn ten, while Jeff Gordon spun and hit the turn eleven tire barrier and sustained minor damage. Dale Jarrett and Kyle Busch both went off track but did not damage their cars.

Qualifying results

Race 
Live television coverage of the race began at 3:30 p.m. Eastern Daylight Time in the United States on TNT. Around the start of the race, weather conditions were sunny, clear, and breezy. Tina Coleman began pre-race ceremonies with an invocation. Actress and singer-songwriter Emmy Rossum performed the national anthem, and retired football wide receiver Jerry Rice along with Mike Wells of the Northern California Toyota Dealers commanded the drivers to start their engines. No drivers moved to the rear of the field.

The race started at 5:22 p.m. McMurray maintained his pole position advantage heading into the first corner, while Stewart fell down the field after he ran wide at the second turn but did not damage his car. Robby Gordon and Earnahrdt moved into the first and second positions, as McMurray dropped to third. The race's first caution was prompted on lap two when Goossens, Kenseth and Kyle Petty made contact in the eleventh turn; Goossens was unable to restart his car. Some drivers made pit stops for fuel and tires under caution. Kenseth and Petty had damage to their cars repaired. Robby Gordon maintained his lead at the lap-five restart, ahead of Earnhardt and McMurray. Three laps later, Earnhardt attempted to pass Robby Gordon at the esses but was unable to complete the manoeuvre. After starting from 32nd, Montoya had moved up into 20th by the 13th lap. Sterling Marlin's engine failed on lap 14, and the race's second caution was issued one lap later because he stopped in turn eight. Some drivers elected to make pit stops during the caution.

Robby Gordon remained the leader for the lap-17 restart, followed by Earnhardt and McMurray. Kyle Busch attempted to pass Montoya in turn eleven but locked his brakes and spun; he avoided contacting the wall but fell to the rear of the field. McMurray passed Earnhardt for second on the following lap. Eight laps later, a brake duct was located in turn four, which triggered the third caution. Robby Gordon led the field back up to speed at the lap-30 restart. Montoya and Johnson made contact on the 32nd lap. Green-flag pit stops began on the next lap when Earnhardt made a pit stop for tires and fuel. McMurray reclaimed the first position when Robby Gordon made his pit stop on lap 35; McMurray held it for the next lap and succeeded it to Johnson as other lead lap drivers made similar pit stops. Hamlin took over the lead when he out-braked Johnson in turn eleven on lap 37. Stewart took over the lead on the 41st lap when Hamlin made his pit stop. Fellows took over the position on the next lap, before the fourth caution was displayed on lap 44 when a large piece of metal was located at the start-finish line.

Fellows chose to pit under caution, and Edwards led the field at the lap-46 restart; he was followed by Kyle Busch, Reed Sorenson, Jones and David Stremme. On lap 49, Kahne and Bobby Labonte made contact which resulted in Labonte spinning; similarly, Joe Nemechek spun at turn eleven and his rear-end hit the tire barriers, all three drivers continued. Robby Gordon moved back up into second when he passed Kyle Busch three laps later. Jarrett battled with Johnny Sauter for position on lap 53, and both drivers made contact; Jarrett spun in turn four and subsequently stalled. The incident prompted the race's fifth caution. Edwards led the field at the lap-56 restart, followed by Robby Gordon. On the same lap, Robby Gordon passed Edwards to retake the lead. The sixth caution was triggered on the next lap when Ragan spun on the chute before entering turn ten; he went through the grass, and was unable to restart his engine. Robby Gordon led the field back to racing speed on the lap-59 restart, followed by Edwards, Kyle Busch, McMurray and Said. McMurray moved up into second position by lap 62 after he passed Kyle Busch and Edwards.

Leitzinger spun into the grass on lap 61, but rejoined the track. On the following lap, Kurt Busch spun sideways in turn eleven after Montoya got into his rear-end and managed to restart his engine despite falling down the order. Sorenson spun off the track, and hit the wall. He continued but spun a second time in turn seven after he clipped a curb which caused the race's seventh (and final) caution. Several drivers chose to pit under caution. McMurray and Edwards made pit stops for fuel and tires, while Said stalled which required his pit crew to push-start his car. Jeff Green collided with teammate Sauter on pit road and damaged his right-front fender. Green was observed speeding, but his race ended after his right-front tire caught fire. Robby Gordon elected not to make a pit stop and remained the leader at the lap-70 restart. Stewart out-braked Robby Gordon to take over the lead on the same lap, while Gordon lost a further position to Earnhardt when he was passed in turn eleven. Earnhardt ceded second position when he made a scheduled pit stop for four tires and fuel two laps later. Robby Gordon made a similar stop on the 75th lap, and Stewart did the same which allowed McMurray to reclaim the lead.

Kenseth spun off into the grass on lap 75; he recovered after correcting his car and continued. Nemechek spun a second time at turn eleven but restarted his car on the following lap. By the 86th lap, McMurray led Harvick, Montoya, Kyle Busch and Burton, and the gap between the top three drivers was at 1.3 seconds five laps later. Harvick was passed by Montoya around the inside at turn eleven on lap 92. Five laps later, McMurray reported his car's engine was cutting out at several points around the track. Montoya made contact with McMurray while attempting to pass him, but McMurray held the first position. Montoya tried again on lap 102 by taking the inside line into turn eleven and momentarily moved in front of McMurray, but ran deep into the corner which allowed McMurray to retain the lead. Two laps later, Montoya passed McMurray around the inside entering turn four to take over the lead. Stewart moved ahead of Jeff Gordon but slid and made contact with Gordon on the 106th lap. Fourth-place runner Edwards ran out of fuel two laps later and drove to pit road; McMurray slowed after running low on fuel. Montoya conserved fuel for the remaining two laps to win his first career victory in the Nextel Cup Series. He became the first foreign-born driver to win in the series since Earl Ross won the 1974 Old Dominion 500, as well as the first Hispanic, and was Chip Ganassi Racing's first victory since October 2002. Harvick finished second, ahead of Richard Childress Racing teammate Jeff Burton in third, Bowyer in fourth and Greg Biffle fifth. Stewart, Jeff Gordon, Kyle Busch, Said and Hamlin rounded out the top ten finishers. The race had seven cautions and eleven lead changes by eight different drivers during the race.

Post-race comments 
Montoya appeared in victory lane to celebrate his first career victory in the Nextel Cup Series in front of the crowd; earning $310,600 for the victory. He said that he was "more relieved than excited" as he was given high expectations that he would perform well in NASCAR. He also stated: "It's huge. I would say right now it's the biggest thing I've done. In open-wheel, that's what I was meant to be winning in. In stock cars, I wasn't. To get our first win in our first year is huge. We know we're a little bit behind on some of the ovals, but I think this is a big boost for everybody working in the shop." Harvick, who finished in second, felt Montoya did not have sufficient fuel to reach the race's conclusion: "I've been a big fan of Montoya's since he came over. He's a great road racer, but he wasn't the fastest. The strategy won it for him today." Third-place finisher Burton was happy with his finishing position: "Obviously we worked really hard all last year and this year on fuel mileage and it paid off for us today. It was a good run for us. We ran competitive all race long."

Jeff Gordon was happy with the way his race was run: "I thought (crew chief) Steve Letarte and everyone on our team just called this race perfectly to come from that far back to a top 10. We played the (pit) strategy the best way we possibly could and we had some cautions fall our way, which was some good fortune for us to gain some spots." Fifth-place finisher Biffle said his car felt good but felt it was difficult to overtake other drivers. Robby Gordon, who led 48 laps (the most of any driver) was disappointed by finishing in 16th position: "Not to make excuses, but we were gonna run out of fuel. It’s disappointing that we had a car as fast as we had, started on the front row, and not just get beat but finish 16th." He said he hoped any problems with his fuel mileage would be resolved by the season's second road course event at Watkins Glen.

Two days after the race, Hendrick Motorsports was given penalties for Jeff Gordon's and Johnson's cars. The penalties, for actions detrimental to stock car racing, car, car parts, components and/or equipment used that did not conform to NASCAR rules, parts or car components not previously approved by NASCAR that were installed or modified to enhance aerodynamic performance, and unauthorized alterations to the car's fender, included a $100,000 fine for crew chiefs Steve Letarte and Chad Knaus who were placed on probation until December 31, 2007, and were suspended from the next six races, and the loss of 100 drivers and owners points for Rick Hendrick, Gordon and Johnson. Nextel Cup Series director John Darby said there was flaring on Johnson's and Gordon's front fenders that increased their width by one inch longer than the regulations allowed. On June 28, Hendrick Motorsports announced they would not appeal the penalties, and Johnson and Gordon later stated that they accepted the decision although they felt the penalties were harsh.

The result kept Gordon in the lead of the Drivers' Championship with 2,438 points, ahead of Hamlin in second. Kenseth and Burton moved up one positions into third and fourth, while Johnson fell to fifth position. Stewart moved in front of Edwards for sixth, while Harvick and Bowyer remained in eighth and ninth positions. Kyle Busch, Truex and Earnhardt rounded out the top twelve. Chevrolet maintained its lead in the Manufacturers' Championship 135 points; Ford remained in second with 86 points. Dodge maintained third position, and Toyota remained in fourth. The race attracted a television audience of 6.5 million people. It took two hours, fifty-six minutes, and eleven seconds to complete the event, and the margin of victory was 4.097 seconds.

Race results

Standings after the race 

Drivers' Championship standings

Manufacturers' Championship standings

 Note: Only the top twelve positions are included for the driver standings.

References 

Toyota Save Mart 350
Toyota Save Mart 350
NASCAR races at Sonoma Raceway
Toyota Save Mart 350